The Directors Guild of Canada Award for Best Direction in a Family Series is a television award that honors direction in programs aimed towards children and family produced in Canada. The award has undergone various name changes since its inception in 2002.

Winners and nominees 
Winners in bold.

2002 
Outstanding Achievement in a Television Movie/ Mini-Series – Children’s
 Shawn Levy – Jett Jackson: The Movie (Disney Channel)
 Laurie Lynd – I Was a Rat (BBC)
 Martin Wood – The Impossible Elephant (Global)
 Philip Spink – Voyage of the Unicorn (Odyssey)
Outstanding Achievement in a Television Series – Children’s
 Bruce McDonald – Degrassi: The Next Generation ("Mother and Child Reunion") (CTV)
 Patrick Williams – The Famous Jett Jackson ("Holly") (Disney Channel)
 Alan Goluboff – Screech Owls ("Instant Replay") (YTV)
 Craig Pryce – The Zack Files ("Photo Double") (YTV)

2003 
Outstanding Achievement in a Television Series – Children’s
 Bruce McDonald – Degrassi: The Next Generation ("When Doves Cry") (CTV)
 Don McCutcheon – Ace Lightning ("Face The Music") (BBC)
 Grant Harvey – Mentors ("Remembrance Day") (Family Channel)
 Patrick Williams – Strange Days at Blake Holsey High ("Wormhole") (Global)

2004 
Outstanding Team Achievement In A Family Feature Film
 Blizzard
 The Blue Butterfly
 Goose on the Loose
Outstanding Team Achievement In A Television Series – Family
 Degrassi: The Next Generation ("Holiday") (CTV)
 The Blobheads ("Reality Bites") (CBC)
 Radio Free Roscoe ("Count On Me") (Family)
 Strange Days at Blake Holsey High ("Shrink") (Global)

2005 
Outstanding Team Achievement In A Family Feature Film
 Saint Ralph
 Bailey's Billion$
 Some Things That Stay
Outstanding Team Achievement In A Family Television Movie/Mini-Series
 A Bear Named Winnie (CBC)
 A Beachcomber's Christmas (CBC)
 Eve's Christmas (Hallmark Channel)
 Plain Truth (Lifetime)
Outstanding Team Achievement In A Television Series – Family
 Degrassi: The Next Generation ("Time Stands Still" Part 2) (CTV)
 Dark Oracle ("Dark Oracle") (YTV)
 Instant Star ("Kiss Me Deadly") (CTV)
 Radio Free Roscoe ("Truth Or Consequence") (Family)

2006 
Outstanding Team Achievement In A Family Television Movie/Mini-Series
 Spirit Bear: The Simon Jackson Story (CTV)
 Booky Makes Her Mark (CBC)
 Christmas in Boston (ABC Family)
 Crazy for Christmas (Movie Central)
Outstanding Team Achievement In A Television Series – Family
 renegadepress.com ("The Rez") (APTN)
 Instant Star ("All Apologies") (CTV)
 Life With Derek ("Babe Raider") (Family)
 Naturally, Sadie ("Double Jeopardy") (Family)

2007 
Outstanding Team Achievement In A Family Television Movie/Mini-Series
 Me and Luke aka A Dad for Christmas (Movie Central)
 Family in Hiding (Lifetime)
Outstanding Team Achievement In A Television Series – Family
 Instant Star ("Date With The Night") (CTV)
 Degrassi: The Next Generation ("Can't Hardly Wait") (CTV)
 Life With Derek ("Fright Night") (Family)
 renegadepress.com ("Blackout" aka Getting it Right) (APTN)

2008 
Outstanding Team Achievement In A Feature Film – Family
 Breakfast with Scot
 How She Move
Outstanding Team Achievement In A Family Television Movie/Mini-Series
 Booky & the Secret Santa (CBC)
 The Good Witch (Hallmark)
 Charlie & Me (Hallmark)
 Roxy Hunter and the Mystery of the Moody Ghost (Nickelodeon)
Outstanding Team Achievement In A Television Series – Family
 Degrassi: The Next Generation ("Pass the Dutchie") (CTV)
 Heartland ("Come What May") (CBC) 
 Instant Star ("Your Time is Gonna Come") (CTV)
 Instant Star ("Us and Them") (CTV)

2009 
Outstanding Team Achievement In A Family Television Movie/Mini-Series
 Anne of Green Gables: A New Beginning (CTV)
 An Old Fashioned Thanksgiving (Hallmark)
 Booky's Crush (CBC)
 Every Second Counts (Hallmark)
Outstanding Team Achievement In A Television Series – Family
 Heartland ("Dancing in the Dark") (CBC)
 Degrassi: The Next Generation ("Fight the Power") (CTV)
 Life With Derek ("How I Met Your Stepbrother") (Family)
 Soul ("My Way") (VisionTV)

2010 
Outstanding Team Achievement In A Television Series – Family
 Heartland ("The Haunting of Hanley Barn") (CBC)
 Degrassi: The Next Generation ("Innocent When You Dream") (CTV)
 How to Be Indie ("How To Party Like Chandra") (YTV)
 Overruled! ("Two Boys and a Baby") (Family)

2011 
Outstanding Team Achievement In A Television Series – Family
 Heartland ("Jackpot!") (CBC)
 Degrassi ("My Body Is a Cage" Part 2) (MuchMusic)
 Tower Prep ("Dreams") (Cartoon Network)
 Wingin' It ("Bully Elliot") (Family)

2012 
Best Television Series – Family
 Heartland ("What's in a Name?") (CBC)
 Degrassi ("Dead and Gone" Part 2) (MuchMusic)
 How to Be Indie ("How to Get Plugged In") (YTV)
 R.L. Stine's The Haunting Hour ("Brush with Madness") (The Hub)

2013 
Best Television Series – Family
 Heartland ("Running Against the Wind") (CBC)
 Degrassi ("Scream" Part 2) (MuchMusic)
 Degrassi ("Bitter Sweet Symphony" Part 2) (MuchMusic)
 Heartland ("The Road Ahead") (CBC)

2014 
Best Television Series – Family
 Heartland ("Darkness and Light") (CBC)
 Degrassi ("Better Man") (MuchMusic)
 Degrassi ("Hypnotize") (MuchMusic)
 Heartland ("The Penny Drops") (CBC)

2015 
Best Television Series – Family 
 Open Heart ("Last Things First") (YTV)
 Degrassi ("There's Your Trouble") (MuchMusic)
 Degrassi ("Firestarter" Part 1) (MuchMusic)
 Degrassi ("Give Me One Reason") (MuchMusic)

2016 
Best Television Series – Family
 Heartland ("Before the Darkness") (CBC)
 Degrassi: Next Class ("#BootyCall") (Family)
 Degrassi: Next Class ("#SorryNotSorry") (Family)
 Degrassi: Next Class ("#ThisCouldBeUsButYouPlayin") (Family)

See also

 Canadian television awards

References 

Family
Awards established in 2002
2002 establishments in Canada